Shehzori (Urdu: شہزوری) is a Pakistani Urdu-language television series that aired in 1974. It was the debut serial of Haseena Moin, who later went on to  become the most famous and successful drama writer of Pakistan, and to this day no writer has matched the popularity that she achieved. Shehzori is based on a work of the same name by Mirza Azeem Baig Chughtai. It was directed by Mohsin Ali.

Synopsis
A young couple get married without telling their parents who do their best to split up the relationship. The short serial focuses on the ups and downs of the couples marital life and how Tara (Neelofar Abbasi) a strong woman, wins her evil father-in-law. This also tells us the story of Mustafa (Shakeel) a weak man who cannot take a stand for his wife. This comedy serial gives out several strong messages which are relevant to this day.

Cast
Shakeel as Mustafa
Neelofar Abbasi as Tara
Mahmood Ali
Ishrat Hashmi
Khalid Nizami
Arsh Muneer
Subhani Ba Yunus

References

See also
Pakistan Television

1970s Pakistani television series
Pakistani drama television series
Pakistan Television Corporation original programming
Pakistani television dramas based on novels
Urdu-language television shows